Full Throttle Motor Speedway @ Varney (formerly Varney International Speedway) is a 1/4 mile high banked short track motor racing oval, located south of the village of Varney, in Durham, Ontario, Canada. The track hosts a weekly Saturday night stock car racing program that runs from May to September each year.

History
In 1966 brothers Joe and Tom Kennedy purchased a 35-acre property on Highway 6 south of Varney, Ontario. In the fall of 1969 the track was constructed with paving, lights, drainage and the first grandstand. The speedway opened in June 1970 and was operated by the Kennedy family until 1985.

New ownership took over the track in 2014 and renamed the facility Full Throttle Motor Speedway.

In 2020 the track was renamed Varney International Speedway when ownership also took over the operation of Grand Bend International Speedway and received NASCAR sanctioning for both locations.

Speedway classes
The tracks weekly racing program features fifteen classes of racing:
 Late Model
 Retro Late Model
 Junior Late Model
 Super Stock
 Street Stock
 Fun Stock
 Mini Stock
 Kid Stock
 Thunder Truck
 Mini Truck
 Junior Mini Truck
 Outlaw Sprints
 Junior Sprint
 Legend Cars
 Crazy Trains

The track also regularly features touring series including the Ontario Sportsman Series, OSCAAR Modifieds, Can-Am Midgets and the Ontario Pro Challenge.

See also
List of auto racing tracks in Canada
Grand Bend International Speedway
Sauble Speedway
Delaware Speedway

References

External links
Full Throttle Motor Speedway @ Varney Official Site
Motorsport venues in Ontario
Paved oval racing venues in Ontario
Motorsport in Canada
1970 establishments in Ontario
Sports venues completed in 1970
Stock car racing
Tourist attractions in Grey County